Billings West High School  is a four-year comprehensive public high school in Billings, Montana. The school serves 1,973 students with over 100 certified staff under principal Kelly Hornby. Billings West's school colors are gold and black, and its mascot is the Golden Bear.

Library 
The West High Library is open from 7:30 am to 3:30 pm on school days. The library has multiple tools utilized by the students such as laptops, GoPros, a green screen, and thousands of books.

Publications 
 Newspaper: The Kodiak (discontinued)
 Yearbook: WestWard

Activities 
In parentheses are the advisors for each club and activity.
 
 Band
 Booster Club
 Business Professionals of America
 Choir
 Chess Club
 Deutsche Club
 Drama Club
 Forensics
 French Club
 German Club
 Key Club
 National Honor's Society
 Orchestra
 Science Club
 Ski Club
 Student Council

References

External links 
West High Website 
West High Sports and Activities

Public high schools in Montana
Schools in Yellowstone County, Montana